Alex James is a British and New Zealand applied mathematician and mathematical biologist whose research involves the mathematical modeling of wildlife behaviour, gender disparities in academia, and the epidemiology of COVID-19. She is a professor in the school of mathematics and statistics at the University of Canterbury in New Zealand, and a researcher with the Te Pūnaha Matatini Centre of Research Excellence for Complex Systems, where she is Deputy Director for Industry and Stakeholder Engagement.

Education and career
After studying mathematics at Newcastle University in England, James earned a master's degree at University College London, and completed a PhD at the University of Leeds, working there with John Brindley on combustion engineering and catalytic converters.

She became a lecturer at Sheffield Hallam University in 2001, and moved to the University of Canterbury in 2004.

Recognition
James was named a Fellow of the New Zealand Mathematical Society (NZMS) in 2015, and won the 2018 NZMS Research Award.

References

External links
Home page

Year of birth missing (living people)
Living people
British mathematicians
British biologists
British women mathematicians
British women biologists
New Zealand mathematicians
New Zealand biologists
New Zealand women scientists
Applied mathematicians
Theoretical biologists
Alumni of Newcastle University
Alumni of University College London
Alumni of the University of Leeds
Academics of Sheffield Hallam University
Academic staff of the University of Canterbury